Martin Christopher Sayer (born June 20, 1987) is a Hong Kong tennis player. He is 1.85m and weighs 89 kg. Sayer is and has been a member of the Hong Kong Davis Cup team, compiling a 15-3 record in Davis Cup action since 2005.

Sayer studied and received his BSc and MBA from Radford University, Virginia and competed in NCAA competitions during the 2005-09 period. In the 2008-09 Season, Sayer reached 100 wins in singles on February 8, 2009 and he won the NCAA Men's Division I Big South Conference Player of the Year Award for three consecutive years, from 2006 to 2008.

From the Davis Cup official website, Sayer and Brian Hung are the most successful doubles team in the Davis Cup of Hong Kong. They competed in a  4-1 win-loss result. On March 8, 2009, Sayer played against Cecil Mamiit of the Philippines in the Davis Cup Asia/Oceania Group II first round. Mamiit won the match 6-4 4-6 3-6 7-6 9-7, the 58 games making it the longest match in the history of the Hong Kong Davis Cup team.

Martin Sayer was member of the "dream team" at Radford University

External links 

1987 births
Living people
Hong Kong expatriates in the United States
Hong Kong male tennis players
Radford University alumni
Tennis people from Virginia
Tennis players at the 2010 Asian Games
Asian Games competitors for Hong Kong
College men's tennis players in the United States